Joe Wilkinson (born 1975) is a British comedian.

Joe Wilkinson may also refer to:

Joe Wilkinson (footballer, born 1934) (1934–2007), English football goalkeeper
Joe Wilkinson (footballer, born 1995), English footballer
Joe Wilkinson (politician) (born 1946), member of the Georgia House of Representatives
Joe Wilkinson, American member of the former band Dropbox

See also
Joseph Wilkinson (disambiguation)
Jo Wilkinson (disambiguation)